Luigi Di Franco (born 18 November 1918, date of death unknown) was an Italian footballer.

Biography
Playing as a left winger, Di Franco played in the Yugoslav Championship with SK Jedinstvo Belgrade where he got first registered at January 1937 and played until 1941. In 1941, he moved to a more popular Belgrade club SK Jugoslavija. With the beginning of the Second World War, the national league was divided, and Di Franco (spelled as Di Franko or Difranko in the Serbian press) finished second with SK Jugoslavija in the 1940–41 season.

With the Axis invasion of Yugoslavia, Di Franco returned to Italy, signing with the Serie A side Venezia. They finished the 1942–43 season at 13th place.

At the end of the war, in 1945, Di Franco signed with Mestrina, which was playing in the Serie B. However, at the end of the 1946–47 season, they were relegated to Serie C. Luigi Di Franco stayed with Mestrina until 1949.

Di Franco moved to Colombia to become player-manager of Deportivo Pereira during the 1949 and 1950 seasons.

Di Franco is deceased.

References

External links
 Luigi Di Franco at enciclopediadelcalcio.it

1918 births
Year of death missing
Footballers from Rome
Italian footballers
Italian expatriate footballers
Association football midfielders
SK Jedinstvo Beograd players
SK Jugoslavija players
Expatriate footballers in Yugoslavia
Venezia F.C. players
Serie A players
Serie B players
Deportivo Pereira footballers
Categoría Primera A players
Italian expatriate sportspeople in Yugoslavia
Italian expatriate sportspeople in Colombia
Expatriate footballers in Colombia
Expatriate football managers in Colombia
Italian football managers
Deportivo Pereira managers